Joint cracking is the manipulation of joints to produce a sound and related "popping" sensation. It is sometimes performed by physical therapists, chiropractors, osteopaths, and masseurs in Turkish baths pursuing a variety of outcomes.

The cracking of joints, especially knuckles, was long believed to lead to arthritis and other joint problems. However, this is not supported by medical research.

The cracking mechanism and the resulting sound is caused by dissolved gas (nitrogen gas) cavitation bubbles suddenly collapsing inside the joints. This happens when the joint cavity is stretched beyond its normal size. The pressure inside the joint cavity drops and the dissolved gas suddenly comes out of solution and takes gaseous form which makes a distinct popping noise.  To be able to crack the same knuckle again requires waiting about 20 minutes before the bubbles dissolve back into the synovial fluid and will be able to form again.

It is possible for voluntary joint cracking by an individual to be considered as part of the obsessive–compulsive disorders spectrum.

Causes

For many decades, the physical mechanism that causes the cracking sound as a result of bending, twisting, or compressing joints was uncertain. Suggested causes included:

Cavitation within the joint—small cavities of partial vacuum form in the synovial fluid and then rapidly collapse, producing a sharp sound.
 Rapid stretching of ligaments.
 Intra-articular (within-joint) adhesions being broken.
Formation of bubbles of joint air as the joint is expanded.

There were several hypotheses to explain the cracking of joints. Synovial fluid cavitation has some evidence to support it. When a spinal manipulation is performed, the applied force separates the articular surfaces of a fully encapsulated synovial joint, which in turn creates a reduction in pressure within the joint cavity. In this low-pressure environment, some of the gases that are dissolved in the synovial fluid (which are naturally found in all bodily fluids) leave the solution, making a bubble, or cavity (tribonucleation), which rapidly collapses upon itself, resulting in a "clicking" sound. The contents of the resultant gas bubble are thought to be mainly carbon dioxide, oxygen and nitrogen. The effects of this process will remain for a period of time known as the "refractory period", during which the joint cannot be "re-cracked", which lasts about 20 minutes, while the gases are slowly reabsorbed into the synovial fluid. There is some evidence that ligament laxity may be associated with an increased tendency to cavitate.

In 2015, research showed that bubbles remained in the fluid after cracking, suggesting that the cracking sound was produced when the bubble within the joint was formed, not when it collapsed. In 2018, a team in France created a mathematical simulation of what happens in a joint just before it cracks. The team concluded that the sound is caused by bubbles' collapse, and bubbles observed in the fluid are the result of a partial collapse. Due to the theoretical basis and lack of physical experimentation, the scientific community is still not fully convinced of this conclusion.

The snapping of tendons or scar tissue over a prominence (as in snapping hip syndrome) can also generate a loud snapping or popping sound.

Relation to arthritis
The common claim that cracking one's knuckles causes arthritis is not supported by scientific evidence. A study published in 2011 examined the hand radiographs of 215 people (aged 50 to 89). It compared the joints of those who regularly cracked their knuckles to those who did not. The study concluded that knuckle-cracking did not cause hand osteoarthritis, no matter how many years or how often a person cracked their knuckles. This early study has been criticized for not taking into consideration the possibility of confounding factors, such as whether the ability to crack one's knuckles is associated with impaired hand functioning rather than being a cause of it.

The medical doctor Donald Unger cracked the knuckles of his left hand every day for more than sixty years, but he did not crack the knuckles of his right hand. No arthritis or other ailments formed in either hand, and for this, he was awarded 2009's satirical Ig Nobel Prize in Medicine.

See also
Crepitus—sounds made by joint

References

Articles containing video clips
Habits
Joints